Defiance County is a county located in the U.S. state of Ohio. As of the 2020 census, the population was 38,286. Its county seat and largest city is Defiance. The county was named after an early Army fortification, Fort Defiance, which was so named by Mad Anthony Wayne to signify the settlers' "defiance" of the Indians. The Defiance, OH Micropolitan Statistical Area includes all of Defiance County.

Geography

Adjacent counties
Williams County (north)
Henry County (east)
Putnam County (southeast)
Paulding County (south)
Allen County, Indiana (southwest)
DeKalb County, Indiana (west)

Demographics

2000 census
As of the census of 2000, there were 39,500 people, 15,138 households, and 11,020 families living in the county. The population density was 96 people per square mile (37/km2). There were 16,040 housing units at an average density of 39 per square mile (15/km2). The racial makeup of the county was 92.59% White, 1.75% Black or African American, 0.26% Native American, 0.36% Asian, 0.02% Pacific Islander, 3.59% from other races, and 1.43% from two or more races. 7.23% of the population were Hispanic or Latino of any race. 45.6% were of German, 13.5% American, 6.8% Irish and 5.1% English ancestry according to Census 2000.

There were 15,138 households, out of which 34.30% had children under the age of 18 living with them, 58.90% were married couples living together, 9.60% had a female householder with no husband present, and 27.20% were non-families. 23.00% of all households were made up of individuals, and 9.50% had someone living alone who was 65 years of age or older. The average household size was 2.57 and the average family size was 3.02.

In the county, the population was spread out, with 26.50% under the age of 18, 9.20% from 18 to 24, 27.40% from 25 to 44, 23.90% from 45 to 64, and 12.90% who were 65 years of age or older. The median age was 36 years. For every 100 females there were 97.30 males. For every 100 females age 18 and over, there were 94.90 males.

The median income for a household in the county was $44,938, and the median income for a family was $50,876. Males had a median income of $37,936 versus $23,530 for females. The per capita income for the county was $19,667. About 4.50% of families and 5.60% of the population were below the poverty line, including 6.40% of those under age 18 and 5.30% of those age 65 or over.

2010 census
As of the 2010 United States Census, there were 39,037 people, 15,268 households, and 10,792 families living in the county. The racial makeup of the county was 92.8% white, 1.9% black or African American, 0.3% Asian, 0.3% American Indian, 2.8% from other races, and 2.0% from two or more races. Those of Hispanic or Latino origin made up 8.7% of the population. In terms of ancestry, 42.3% were German, 12.5% were Irish, 9.6% were English, and 7.7% were American.

Of the 15,268 households, 32.4% had children under the age of 18 living with them, 55.1% were married couples living together, 10.8% had a female householder with no husband present, 29.3% were non-families, and 24.6% of all households were made up of individuals. The average household size was 2.51 and the average family size was 2.97. The median age was 39.4 years.

The median income for a household in the county was $44,480 and the median income for a family was $54,472. Males had a median income of $44,354 versus $30,610 for females. The per capita income for the county was $22,139. About 11.2% of families and 12.7% of the population were below the poverty line, including 18.0% of those under age 18 and 7.1% of those age 65 or over.

Politics
Prior to 1940, Defiance County was a Democratic stronghold, voting Republicans only 3 times since 1856. But starting with the 1940 election, it has become a Republican stronghold with Lyndon Johnson in 1964 the lone Democrat to win the county since.

|}

Communities

City
Defiance (county seat)

Villages
Hicksville
Ney
Sherwood

Townships

Adams
Defiance
Delaware
Farmer
Hicksville
Highland
Mark
Milford
Noble
Richland
Tiffin
Washington

https://web.archive.org/web/20160715023447/http://www.ohiotownships.org/township-websites

Unincorporated communities
Evansport
Farmer
Jewell
Mark Center

In popular culture
The closeness of elections in Defiance County has also been referenced in fiction; the ABC political drama Scandal in its second season had as the center of the ongoing plot of the first half of that season, a vote manipulation conspiracy which bent the presidential election towards Republican candidate Fitzgerald Grant based on tampering of the voting machines in Defiance County.

See also
National Register of Historic Places listings in Defiance County, Ohio

References

External links
Defiance County Government's website

 
1845 establishments in Ohio
Populated places established in 1845